The 1907 Dickinson football team was an American football team that represented Dickinson College as an independent during the 1907 college football season. The team compiled a 3–4–2 record and was outscored by a total of 202 to 34. Joseph Pipal was the head coach.

Schedule

References

Dickinson
Dickinson Red Devils football seasons
Dickinson football